Bertier may refer to:

People 
 Antoine Bertier (1761–1854), French landowner and politician
 Charles Bertier  (1860–1924), French landscape painter.
 Charles Bertier (journalist) (1821–1882), Governor of Martinique from 1867 to 1869
 Georges Bertier  (1877–1962), French educator
 Gerry Bertier (1953–1981), Virginia high school American football player
 Michel Bertier (1695–1740), surgeon-major of Quebec, Canada

See also
De Bertier de Sauvigny, aristocratic French surname.